Keith Ian Neale (born 19 January 1935) is an English former professional footballer who played in the Football League for Birmingham City and Lincoln City. He played as an inside forward.

Career
Neale was born in the Yardley district of Birmingham. He played in the Birmingham Works League for the Metropolitan works team before joining Birmingham City, initially as an amateur, in August 1953. He remained in the junior teams for some time before making his debut in the League Division on 10 April 1957, deputising for Gordon Astall at outside right in the local derby at home to Aston Villa, a game which Birmingham lost 2–1. He played once more that season and three times in 1957–58, standing in variously for Eddy Brown and Noel Kinsey, but the strength of Birmingham's forward line in the mid-1950s was such that Neale was only ever considered as a reserve.

In November 1957 he joined Second Division club Lincoln City, but played only nine games in all competitions before dropping down into non-league football at the end of the 1958–59 season. He spent the next season with Kettering Town of the Southern League, scoring 18 goals from 32 games, and also played for Boston United and Gainsborough Trinity.

References

External links
 

1935 births
Living people
Footballers from Birmingham, West Midlands
English footballers
Association football forwards
Birmingham City F.C. players
Lincoln City F.C. players
Kettering Town F.C. players
Boston United F.C. players
Gainsborough Trinity F.C. players
English Football League players
Southern Football League players